The black-collared lovebird (Agapornis swindernianus) also known as Swindern's lovebird is a small, 13.5 cm  (5 in) long, African parrot in the genus Agapornis. It is a mostly green parrot with black band on the back of its neck, and a dark greyish-black bill. Both sexes are similar. It is rarely kept in captivity because of its dietary requirement for a native fig.

Description
It is a mostly green parrot with black-collared nape, brownish red chest, greyish black bill, yellow iris and grey feet. Both sexes are similar.

Taxonomy
There are three subspecies of the black-collared lovebird:
 The nominate subspecies, A. s. swindernianus - Liberia, Côte d'Ivoire and Ghana
 Cameroon black-collared lovebird, A. s. zenkeri - Cameroon, Gabon and Congo
 Ituri black-collared lovebird or Emin's lovebird, A. s. emini - Democratic Republic of the Congo and Uganda.

The black-collared lovebird was discovered by Heinrich Kuhl in 1820. The name commemorates the Dutch professor, Theodore van Swinderen of University of Groningen.

Distribution and habitat
The black-collared lovebird is distributed across a wide range in equatorial Africa. It inhabits the forests of Cameroon, Central African Republic, the Republic of Congo, the Democratic Republic of Congo, Côte d'Ivoire, Equatorial Guinea, Gabon, Ghana, Liberia and Uganda.  They hide high in the forest canopy and are characterized as being very shy.

Status
It is rare in some parts of its range.  The range is so large that the population is difficult to estimate, but it is believed that the population is not under significant threat. The black-collared lovebird is evaluated as Least Concern on the IUCN Red List of Threatened Species.

Aviculture
Black-collared lovebirds are rarely kept in captivity or as pets. They require certain native fig seed or fig flesh as a basis of their daily diet, and without these vital dietary necessities they do not normally thrive or breed well in captivity.

References

black-collared lovebird
Birds of the African tropical rainforest
black-collared lovebird